The Moco Museum (Modern Contemporary Museum) is an independent museum located in Amsterdam, the Netherlands and Barcelona, Spain, dedicated to exhibiting modern and contemporary art. The museum was founded with the mission of attracting broader and younger audiences, and making art accessible to the public.

Moco Museum in Amsterdam is situated on Museumplein, in the historic Villa Alsberg, a townhouse designed in 1904 by Eduard Cuypers the nephew of Pierre Cuypers, designer of Amsterdam Central Station and the Rijksmuseum. The townhouse was one of the first privately owned residencies on Museumplein and remained so until 1939. Moco Museum opened its doors in April 2016.

Moco Museum in El Born, Barcelona is in the historic Palau Cervelló-Giudice, formerly the private residence of the noble Cervelló family until the 18th Century. The building incorporates parts of a previous construction from the 15th Century, evidenced by the interior courtyard, arched staircase with columns, capitals, and Renaissance-type mouldings. Furthermore, Palau Cervelló displays an impressive Gothic facade entryway.

Exhibitions 
Amsterdam Exhibitions

 2017 Nov 03 - 20 May 2019 — Roy Lichtenstein: Lasting Influence. A full-body, experiential exhibition space that draws upon the painterly legacy of Vincent van Gogh and his influence on the works of Roy Lichtenstein.
 2018 Jun 01 09 Jan 2019 — Icy & Sot: A Moment of Clarity. The first retrospective show from the contemporary street art brothers and political activists from Iran.
 2019 Jan 18 - 01 Apr 2020— Daniel Arsham: Connecting Time. The New York-based contemporary artist makes his debut in the Netherlands.
 2019 Mar 22 — Yayoi Kusama. A dedicated exhibition space at Moco presents works from the prolific, female artist, Night of Stars and Pumpkin.
 2019 Sep 25 - 28 Jan 2020 — JR Room. Moco Museum unites important artworks from the French street artist and photographer, JR. The Gun Chronicles: A Story of America by JR debuts at Moco Museum in Amsterdam.
 2020 Feb 03 — Studio Irma: Reflecting Forward. (Made in collaboration with Moco.) A digital immersive art exhibition and inclusive experience where space, people, and modern technology blend in harmony.
 2020 Nov 19 — THE KID :  The Future Is Old. Moco Museum premieres the first solo exhibition in the Netherlands of international contemporary artist THE KID, who questions social determinism and the frontier between innocence and corruption in modern societies.

Barcelona Exhibitions

 2021 Oct 16 — Guillermo Lorca: Esplendor de la Noche. Moco Museum presents the first European solo show from the contemporary Chilean artist. Esplendor de la Noche brings together a series of seven large-scale works that combine magic and realism with images of tender beauty and scenes of brutality. Curated by Simon de Pury.
 2021 Oct 16 — NFT. Europe's first dedicated exhibition space to NFTs. The exhibitions brings together a selection of NFTs from the artists like Andrés Reisinger, Blake Kathryn x Paris Hilton, Frederico Clapis, Alotta Money and Beeple.

Ongoing Exhibitions

 Ongoing — Banksy: Laugh Now. The 'unauthorized' exhibition features highlights such as Beanfield, Girl with a Balloon and Flower Thrower.
 Ongoing — Moco Garden. The museum's outdoor exhibition space changes and evolves frequently to enrich patrons' museum experience. Features works by Banksy, KAWS, WhIsBe, Fidia, Marcel Wanders and more.
 Ongoing — Moco Masters. A revolving exhibition that highlights modern and contemporary artists who have inspired an enduring legacy. Featuring works by Andy Warhol, Jean-Michel Basquiat, Jeff Koons, Damien Hirst, Keith Haring, Os Gemeos and more.

References

External links
https://mocomuseum.com/
Moco Museum Barcelona Review (German)

Museums in Amsterdam
Art museums and galleries in the Netherlands
Amsterdam-Zuid
Modern art museums
Art museums established in 2016
2016 establishments in the Netherlands
21st-century architecture in the Netherlands